There are a series of tents (often called beer tents) at the Oktoberfest, which are operated by different Wiesn-hosts and in which some come from a long tradition. Some tents belong to the local breweries. The setup work for the tents often begins three months before the start of the festival.

Big marquees

Armbrustschützenzelt 

The Armbrustschützenzelt (crossbow firing tent) has been around since 1895. It has 5,830 indoor and 1,620 outdoor seats. Festwirt (tent operator) is Peter Inselkammer, brother of the owner of the Ayinger Brewery. What is poured however, come from the Paulaner Brewery, since only beer from Munich breweries is served at the Oktoberfest. The German Championship for crossbow, 30m national discipline, takes place traditionally every year in the Armbrustschützenzelt.

Augustiner-Bräu 

The Augustiner brewery is the only Munich brewery that still delivers the beer in wooden barrels to the Oktoberfest. The tent has 6000 indoor and 2500 outdoor seats. The tent operators are Manfred and Thomas Vollmer, who also operate two large Augustiner restaurants in Munich (Landsberger Straße and Neuhauser Straße).

Bräurosl / Pschorrbräu-Festhalle 

The Bräurosl is the tent of the host family Heide, who also runs the large restaurant Heide-Volm in Planegg near Munich. This tent traditionally holds the "Gay Sunday" ("Rosa Weisn") every year on the first Sunday of the Oktoberfest, which emerged from a club event of the MLC (Münchner Löwen Club).

Landmarks of the Bräurosl tent are two almost 20-meter-high Maibäume (Maypoles) placed at the front of the tent. In 2004 a new tent was opened with 6,000 indoor seats and 2,500 outdoor seats. In 2010, the Bräurosl tent had 6,200 indoor seats and 2,200 outdoor seats.

Hacker-Pschorr beer is served there.

Fischer-Vroni 
The Fischer-Vroni - among the 14 large tents at the Oktoberfest is one of the smallest - received a new tent in 2006 with side galleries, which another gallery above the main entrance was added in 2011 and in 2013 expanded to include a wooden barrel stock. It has 3080 indoor and 700 outdoor seats. Like the Augustiner tents, here Augustiner beer is served on tap. Specialties here are the Steckerlfisch, a grilled spit fish. For several years now on second festival Monday it has come to tradition that the gays and lesbians "occupy" the tent. This tradition goes back to the now deceased gay host of the Prosecco bar who simply reserved some tables for his guests, and many other gays and lesbians joined in. Meanwhile, this tradition is so well known, that guests need to come early in order to be able to get a place to join the celebration.

Hacker-Tent 

The 90.5 × 43 meter Hacker-Tent offers indoor seating for 6,950 people, and another 2,350 outdoor seats. The tent was redesigned in 2004 by Rolf Zehetbauer in order to fit in with the advertising slogan of the Hacker brewery, "Himmel der Bayern" (Heaven of the Bavarians), in which the tent interior ceiling was elaborately decorated. In addition, a 5x5 meter opening was installed in the beer tent ceiling, to which the operator called a “Convertible roof”. The revolving stage located inside the tent was also renewed. The Schlager group Die Kirchdorfer have been playing there since 1994 as the official festival band daily from noon until 22:30. As a show act, the Munich party band "Cagey Strings" plays daily from 19:00 till 20:30. The "Festwirt" (Festival Manager) from the Hacker-tent is Toni Roiderer, spokesmen for the festival hosts and innkeeper in Straßlach.

Hippodrom 

The Hippodrom was first erected at the Oktoberfest by Carl Gabriel in 1902 as a snack and show booth. Until the 1980s, special features in the tent was a horse riding track, a hippodrome, where visitors could ride. During this time a barker stood outside. In the Hippodrom, beer from the Spaten-Franziskaner Brewery was served. It was located right next to the main entrance of the Oktoberfest. Festwirt (Festival Manager) was Sepp Krätz, from 1995 till 2013, a tenant of the Waldwirtschaft in Großhesselohe. The concession was taken from him following a conviction of tax evasion. The succeeding tent was the Marstall.

Bands played regularly in the Hippodrom. There were 3,300 seats in the tent and 1,000 outside. The Schlager group "Münchner Zwietracht" (Munich Discord) played for more than ten years every evening at the Hippodrome. Linda Jo Rizzo was presented as a "star guest".

Marstall 

The Marstall took over the place of the Hippodrom as of the Oktoberfest 2014. The host of the tent is the Able family. The Marstall offers 3200 seats. Another 1100 people find room in the beer garden and at the bar. Providing brewery, as by the predecessor Hippodrom, is the Spaten-Franziskaner brewery. Even musically the Marstall follows in the tradition of the Hippodrom, with performances from the "Münchner Zweitracht" and "Die Oberbayern", along with others.

Hofbräu tent 

The Hofbräu tent is, with a total of almost 10,000 seats, the largest beer tent at the Oktoberfest (6,018 seats and 1,000 standing places indoors, and an additional 3,022 seats outdoor). It has been under the leadership of the Steinberg family since the 1980s, to which is also the tenant of the Hofbräuhaus cellar's since 1995. Under the leadership of the family, significant structural change were carried out in the tent. The only standing area with 1,000 places can be found in the Hofbräu-festival tent. In the tent, 12 quintal hop vines, the harvest an entire hop filed, are hung as decoration.  The tent is erected on an area of over 7,000 m2. In the almost two weeks of the festival, more than 782,400 liters of beer, 70,700 BBQ chicken halves, 4,200 pork hocks and 6,200 pork sausage servings are consumed.

In 2005 the tent was extended a bit, and was given a new façade.

Because of the world-famous Hofbräuhaus, it is by far the most popular tent for tourists and many celebrities.

Käfer Wiesn Schänke 
The Käfer Wiesn Schänke festival pub, which first made its appearance in 1971, is one of the smaller companies at the Oktoberfest. The festival pub is not a tent, but a large log house, constructed in the style of a Bavarian farm. The house offers enough space for 1,400 guests, with an additional 1,900 seats located outside.[16] As a branch from Feinkost Käfer, unlike the other tents, here special dishes are offered. Often encounters with celebrity athletes, actors, and other famous people occur in the pub. Service in the Käfer-Schänke ends at 0:30 at night (other tents end at 22:30); wine and champagne is also served here.

Löwenbräu tent 

A notable aspect of this tent, with 8,500 seats both inside and out, is the  Löwenbräu tower with a movable lion who used to speak with help from a recording. The tent sky is lit up by 16,000 light bulbs. Since 1989, the Ladies Wiesn takes place inside the Löwenbrau tent, and is a meeting place for female celebrities. Initiator is the millionaire Regine Sixt, wife of Erich Sixt

It is the world's first beer tent with an ISO 9001 certificate.  The managers are Christa Ludwig Hagn and Stephanie Spendler.

Ochsenbraterei 
In the Ochsenbraterei (German for ox rotisserie) tent, Spaten beer is served. In September 1881, butcher Johann Rössler, had the first roasted ox on a skewer at the Oktoberfest and offered it in a snack venue. The business had to stop in 1882, since he was unable to serve beer. Starting in 1898, he was able to reopen his Ochsenbraterei.  In 1901 his 200th ox was roasted.

The tent has a floor area of 4,200 m2, offering 5950 seats (to which 1660 seats are in the pit); next to which is a self serve area covering a total of 1700 m2 and includes 1600 seats.  The tent has 5 serving areas where beer is served on tap.

The current tent was manufactured in 1980; set up takes 10 weeks, and disassembly takes 5 weeks.

Schottenhamel 

The history of the tent as a gastronomical facility dates back to 1867, when the Schottenhamel was a shack behind the Kings Royal tent. Today's festival managers are Michael F. and Christian Schottenhammel. The tent exists since 1953 and has an area of 4,800 m2 with 6,000 seats and two galleries. 4,000 Seats are located outdoors in an area of 2,200 m2. The first tapping of the keg, by the Munich mayor, every Oktoberfest is held in the Schottenhamel tent. The tent is traditionally the home for the Munich student organizations, which can be seen also on the coat of arms with a compass located on the one the tent side walls. The crowds here are mostly young.

In the Schottenhamel tent, Spaten Beer is also served. A special feature is the attire of the female waitresses; classic waitress aprons and caps (instead of a Dirndl). The benches in Schottenhammel are shorter and placed around the square tables. The Schottenhammel is nicknamed "The tent of youth".

Schützen Festzelt 

The Schützen Festzelt belongs to the smaller beer tents, with its 5,361 seats (approximately 4,300 inside and approximately 1,090 outside). Judging by the ground coverage, it is the biggest tent of the Oktoberfest. It is located next to the Bavaria and therefore away from the big 'Bierstraße' (Beer Street). Many tourists overlook the tent, since the entrance is not that of a typical beer tent. The audience here on average used to be older, and the atmosphere more cozy that in the other tent. Due to the evening performances from "Die Niederalmer", which play Rock and Pop, the mood in the tent has changed, and the audience in the recent years has become younger. The Schützen tent is located next to the Hacker tent and the Schottenhamel tent, creating a meeting point for the youth of Munich.

One of the oldest tents at the Oktoberfest, it has a special feature: in 110 shooting range spots, the Oktoberfest-Landesschießen of marksmen takes place. The tent is also famous for its geranium balcony. The innkeepers are Claudia and Eduard Reinbold. The specialty of the tent is malt beer marinated roasted pig.

Weinzelt 
In the Weinzelt (Wine Tent) of Roland, Doris and Stephan Kuffler, white beer is served until 21:00, after which the alcoholic beverages only include wine, sparkling wine, and champagne. The tent has been operating since 1984, with a total of 2,500 seats, and is one of the smaller tents at the Oktoberfest. In 2005, the wine tent was completely redesigned, and is rebuilt every year.
The old tent was auctioned off in October 2006 on eBay. Paulaner brewery is the supplier for the tent, as well as various Vineyards and the Nymphenburg Sektkellerei (Champagne Cellar). Special feature of the tent: open until 1 am. The other tents (except the Käfer tent) stop serving at 2230.

Winzerer Fähndl - Paulaner festival hall 

The Winzerer Fähndl can be seen from afar, with its large tower with a  rotating Paulaner beer mug on top. The name "Winzerer Fähndl" for the Paulaner festival hall comes from the time, where the crossbow shooting club, which carried the same name, had its headquarters there and even fired their crossbows in the tent. Later, the crossbowmen moved to the then new Armbrustschützenzelt. The name of the guild - Winzerer Fähndl – remained the name of the Paulaner festival hall with its 8,450 indoor seats and 2,450 seats in the garden. In 2010, the old tent was replaced by a self-supporting structure, which has no support columns inside the tent. Hosts are Peter and Arabella Pongratz.

Smaller festival tents 
In addition to the 15 large tents found at the Oktoberfest, there are also the smaller tents, which are mainly the rotisserie chicken stands like Wienerwald, Cafe Kaiserschmarrn (Rischart), Vinzenz Murr, Poschners, Heimer, Cafe Mohrenkopf, Bodos café tent, the Inn in Schichtl and the Ammer chicken and canard rotisserie that, since 2000, only sells organic products.

References

External links 
 Official Oktoberfest homepage

Tents
Beer in Germany
Culture of Altbayern
Buildings and structures in Munich
Tents